Robert, Bob, Bobby, Rob or Robbie Ellis may refer to:

Academics
 Robert Ellis (theologian) (born 1956), principal of Regent's Park College, Oxford
 Robert Ellis (classicist) (1820–1885), English classical scholar
 Robert Leslie Ellis (1817–1859), English mathematician and polymath
 Robert Ellis (mathematician) (1926–2013), American mathematician
 Robert Ellis (artist) (1929–2021), New Zealand artist and art professor

Actors
 Robert Ellis (actor, born 1892) (1892–1974), American film actor, screenwriter and film director
 Robert Ellis (actor, born 1933) (1933–1973), American child actor in the 1940s and 1950s
 Robert Ellis (Scottish actor), Scottish television actor in the 1980s and 1990s

Musicians
 Bobby Ellis (1932–2016), Jamaican trumpet player
 Rob Ellis (DJ), English radio DJ
 Rob Ellis (producer) (born 1962), English drummer, producer and arranger
 Rob Ellis, bass player for the American rock band Seven Wiser
 Robert Ellis (singer-songwriter) (born 1988), alt country music singer-songwriter
 Robert Ellis (musician), bass trombone player in the folk band La Bottine Souriante

Politicians
 Robert Ellis (fl. 1406), Member of Parliament (MP) for Great Yarmouth in 1406
 Robert Ellis (fl. 1414-1422), MP for Great Yarmouth, son of earlier MP
 Sir Robert Ellis, 1st Baronet (1874–1956), British Conservative MP 1922–1923, 1924–1929, 1931–1945

Sportsmen
 Rob Ellis (baseball) (born 1950), major league baseball outfielder in the 1970s
 Robert Ellis (baseball) (born 1970), major league baseball pitcher in the 1990s
 Robert Ellis (cricketer) (1853–1937), English cricketer
 Rob Elowitch (born 1943), American professional wrestler known by the ring name Robbie Ellis

Writers
 Bob Ellis (1942–2016), Australian journalist
 Robert Ellis (author) (born 1954), American crime fiction writer

Other
 Robert Ellis (24 character), fictional character in the television series 24
 Robert Ellis (clergyman) (1898–1966), minister with the Presbyterian Church of Wales
 Robert M. Ellis (1922–2014), American artist, educator, and museum director
 Robert Stanton Ellis (1825–1877), British civil servant of the Indian civil service
 Robert Ellis (Cynddelw) (1812–1875), minister and poet
 Robert Kevin Ellis (1954–2014), British businessman murdered in Bali

See also 
 Rob Elles (born 1951), British molecular geneticist